Ataxin-2-like protein was initially identified in 1996 and designated Ataxin-2 Related protein (A2RP) as the search for the gene causing SCA2 lead to the identification of 2 cDNA clones with high similarity to ATXN2 (Pulst et al, 1996). It was later renamed as ATXN2L. It is a protein that in humans is encoded by the ATXN2L gene.

This gene encodes an ataxin type 2 related protein of unknown function. This protein is a member of the spinocerebellar ataxia (SCAs) family, which is associated with a complex group of neurodegenerative disorders. Several alternatively spliced transcripts encoding different isoforms have been found for this gene.

Interactions
ATXN2L has been shown to interact with Myeloproliferative leukemia virus oncogene.

References

External links

Further reading